The 1999–2000 Scottish First Division was won by St Mirren, finishing as one of two promoted teams. As the Scottish Premier League was being expanded to twelve teams Dunfermline Athletic were to be joined by Falkirk in a three team playoff against Aberdeen with the top two placed teams entering the Scottish Premier League.  However, this did not occur as Falkirk's Brockville Stadium did not meet the then SPL requirements for having a 10,000 all-seater stadium. Clydebank finished bottom and were relegated to the Scottish Second Division.

Stadia and locations

Table

Top scorers

Attendances
The average attendances for Scottish First Division clubs for season 1999/00 are shown below:

References

Scottish First Division seasons
1999–2000 Scottish Football League
2
Scot